Michael Eberwein (born 11 March 1996) is a German professional footballer who plays as a midfielder for Borussia Dortmund II.

Career
In June 2019, it was announced Eberwein would join 2. Bundesliga side Holstein Kiel from 3. Liga club SC Fortuna Köln for the 2019–20 season. He agreed a two-year contract until 2021.

On 25 October 2019, Eberwein became the first non-playing substitute to concede a penalty kick in professional football. In the game between Holstein Kiel and VfL Bochum, Eberwein (warming up behind the outer goal-line) involuntarily stopped a kick by Bochum inside the penalty area, leading to a penalty kick for Bochum and a yellow card for Eberwein.

He signed for 3. Liga side Hallescher FC on a two-year contract in September 2020.

References

External links
 Profile at FuPa.net
 

1996 births
Living people
People from Freising (district)
Sportspeople from Upper Bavaria
Footballers from Bavaria
German footballers
Association football midfielders
Borussia Dortmund II players
SC Fortuna Köln players
Holstein Kiel players
Hallescher FC players
2. Bundesliga players
3. Liga players
Regionalliga players